The following is an incomplete discography for Mello Music Group, an independent hip hop record label based in Tucson, Arizona. Artists such as Mr. Lif, Oddisee, Big Pooh and Open Mike Eagle have released records through Mello Music Group.

Discography

Main CD series

References 

Mello Music Group
Mello Music Group albums
Discographies of American record labels